Brian John Edward "Sandy" Lane  (18 June 1917 – 13 December 1942) was a fighter pilot and flying ace of the Royal Air Force during the Second World War. He was also an author.

Early life

Born in Pannal, Harrogate, Lane grew up in Pinner and attended St Paul’s School in Hammersmith before entering the RAF in 1936. He was the son of Henry Fitzgerald William Lane and Bessie Elinor Lane (née Hall). After leaving school, Lane worked as a factory supervisor.

RAF career

1936–1941
Lane joined the Royal Air Force in 1936, with service number 37859.  After training at 3 E&RFTS Hamble in March 1936, he was posted to No. 11 Flying Training School at RAF Wittering on 1 June and was commissioned into the RAF General Duties Branch on 18 May 1936 on a short service commission. Upon completion of his training, he joined No. 66 Squadron RAF at RAF Duxford on 8 January 1937 at the rank of Pilot Officer. In June 1937 Lane moved to No. 213 Squadron RAF at RAF Northolt. He was promoted to Flying Officer on 23 December 1938. Shortly before the outbreak of war, Lane joined No. 19 Squadron RAF at RAF Duxford as an Officer Commanding "A" Flight, flying Spitfires.

In June 1940, Lane married famous racing driver Eileen Ellison in Cambridge.

During the Dunkirk evacuation in May 1940 Lane was awarded the Distinguished Flying Cross (DFC) for his bravery, and his official rating as a fighter pilot classed "exceptional". He became acting squadron commander on 25 May 1940 when the incumbent commanding officer was shot down over Dunkirk.

By September 1940, during the peak of the Battle of Britain, Lane's abilities as a fighter pilot and leader were duly recognised, and he was promoted to squadron leader.

Lane's No. 19 Squadron RAF often operated with No. 242 Squadron RAF, and led by 242's Squadron Leader Douglas Bader, the squadrons often working together as part of the Duxford Wing, 12 Group's controversial "Big Wing" formation.

After the Battle of Britain, Lane continued flying with 19 Squadron until June 1941 when he was posted to the No. 12 Group RAF staff at RAF Hucknall.

1941–1942
In November 1941 Lane was posted on a staff appointment to the Middle East. In June 1942 Lane returned to England to command No. 61 OTU at Mountford Bridge, until December 1942 when he joined No. 167 Squadron RAF at RAF Ludham as a supernumerary squadron leader flying the Spitfire Mk. V.

He made his first operational flight with the Squadron on 13 December 1942, during which he was last seen giving chase to two Focke-Wulf 190 fighters. He never returned from this mission and was listed as "missing in action". Lane has no known grave having most likely been shot down over the North Sea. It is probable he was a victim of Oblt. Leonhardt of 6./JG 1 and crashed into the sea 30 km west of Schouwen  at 16:34 hrs.

During Lane's operational career, he claimed 6 (and 1 shared) enemy aircraft shot down, 2 unconfirmed destroyed, 1 probable destroyed and 1 damaged.

Published work
Lane was the author of Spitfire!, which was originally published in 1942 under the pseudonym B.J. Ellan. The book is a firsthand account of Lane's experiences as a front line Spitfire pilot, and is one of only a few contemporaneous autobiographical accounts of the life of a Battle of Britain Spitfire pilot.

Historian Dilip Sarkar spent many years editing and researching the original work to replace the code words used by the war time censor with the correct names of people and places. The revised book was republished in 2009 and again in 2011.

Interviews
This is what some of Lane's fellow 19 Squadron pilots and crew thought of him:

Flight Sergeant George "Grumpy" Unwin: "He was completely unflappable, no matter what the odds, his voice always calm and reassuring, issuing orders which always seemed to be the right decisions."

Sergeant David Cox: "Quite simply Brian Lane was the best CO [Commanding Officer] I ever served under, in every respect, and when my turn came to lead, I modelled myself on him."

Corporal Fred Roberts: "...he was an absolutely wonderful man. Early on in the war, some of the officers could still be a bit snobbish, but not Brian Lane, who knew everyone in his command, no matter how lowly their rank or status, by their first names."

Memorial plaque
A permanent memorial plaque, organised by local resident Paul Baderman, was unveiled on Lane's former home in Pinner, London on 25 September 2011, 69 years after his death. A crowd of about 400 people attended the short ceremony which saw guests of honour Flt Lt K A Wilkinson RAF and Mr John Milne unveil the plaque. Flt Lt Wilkinson flew under Lane's command in 19 Squadron and Milne was Lane's Rigger, responsible for refuelling Lane's Spitfire and the repair of its airframe.

See also
List of people who disappeared mysteriously at sea

References

External links

 Photograph of Lane

1917 births
1940s missing person cases
1942 deaths
20th-century biographers
Aerial disappearances of military personnel in action
Royal Air Force personnel killed in World War II
British World War II flying aces
English biographers
English male non-fiction writers
English non-fiction writers
Military personnel from Yorkshire
Missing in action of World War II
Missing person cases in Europe
Recipients of the Distinguished Flying Cross (United Kingdom)
Royal Air Force pilots of World War II
Royal Air Force squadron leaders
The Few